Les Franqueses del Vallès is a municipality in the comarca of the Vallès Oriental in Catalonia, Spain. It lies to the north of Granollers, the capital and largest city in the comarca. The municipality covers an area of 29.1 km², and has about 20,000 inhabitants.

It is divided into five neighbourhoods: Bellavista, Corró d'Amunt, Corró d'Avall, Llerona and Marata.

Demography

References 

Sources
 Panareda Clopés, Josep Maria; Rios Calvet, Jaume; Rabella Vives, Josep Maria (1989). Guia de Catalunya, Barcelona: Caixa de Catalunya.

External links 

  
 Government data pages 

Franqueses del Valles, Les